Renan Andrade Ferreira (born 31 May 1995), sometimes known as just Renan, is a Brazilian footballer who plays as a defender.

References

External links
 

1995 births
Living people
Association football defenders
Brazilian footballers
FC Tulsa players
USL Championship players